Zillmer is a surname. Notable people with the surname include:

Eileen Zillmer (born 1952), German figure skater
Ray Zillmer (1887–1960), American attorney, mountaineer, and conservationist

See also
 Ziller (surname)
 Zillmere, Queensland
 Zillner